Joseph in Egypt is an oil painting on panel of  by Pontormo, now in the National Gallery in London, which bought it in 1882. Like the same artist's Joseph's Brothers Beg for Help, Joseph Sold to Potiphar and Pharaoh with his Butler and Baker (all also in the National Gallery), it was originally part of the Marriage Chamber in the Palazzo Borgherini in Florence.

References

1518 paintings
Paintings depicting Joseph (Genesis)
Paintings by Pontormo
Collections of the National Gallery, London